Chen Haozhu (6 November 1924 – 30 October 2020) was a Chinese cardiologist.

Career
Chen was born on 6 November 1924, and attended , where he completed a bachelor's degree in 1949. He was responsible for introducing the term "myocardial infarction" to Chinese medical professionals, and credited with pioneering modern cardiology in China by using newer methods of treatment and diagnosis. Chen was the director of the Shanghai Institute of Cardiovascular Diseases and served as vice chair of the Chinese Society of Cardiology, as well as the Chinese Medical Association. He taught as a professor at Zhongshan Hospital, affiliated to Fudan University, and was elected a member of the Chinese Academy of Engineering in 1997.

Chen died on 30 October 2020, aged 95.

References

1924 births
2020 deaths
20th-century Chinese physicians
Cardiologists
Members of the Chinese Academy of Engineering
Academic staff of Fudan University